Navicula bita is a freshwater species of algae in the genus Navicula.

References

Further reading
 

bita
Species described in 1961